Raja Vikramarka may refer to: 

 Raja Vikramarka (1990 film), a 1990 Indian Telugu-language film
 Raja Vikramarka (2021 film), a 2021 Indian Telugu-language film